A capital improvement plan (CIP), or capital improvement program, is a short-range plan, usually four to ten years, which identifies capital projects and equipment purchases, provides a planning schedule and identifies options for financing the plan. Essentially, the plan provides a link between a government or corporate entity and a comprehensive and strategic plan and the entity's annual budget.

Benefits
A CIP provides many benefits including: 
 Allows for a systematic evaluation of all potential projects at the same time. 
 The ability to stabilize debt and consolidate projects to reduce borrowing costs. 
 Serve as a public relations and economic development tool. 
 A focus on preserving a governmental entity's infrastructure while ensuring the efficient use of public funds. 
 An opportunity to foster cooperation among departments and an ability to inform other units of government of the entity's priorities. For example, it is not uncommon for a large city or county to incorporate into its CIP the capital needs of a school district, parks and recreation department and/or some other public service structure.

Features
The CIP typically includes the following information:

 A listing of the capital projects or equipment to be purchased
 The projects ranked in order of preference
 The plan for financing the projects
 A timetable for the construction or completion of the project
 Justification for the project
 Explanation of expenses for the project

Overall process
Prior to undertaking the development of the CIP, the government entity will want to define the criteria for what kind of projects or equipment are to be included and organize a process for developing the plan. What is defined as a capital project or capital purchase may vary from city to county to district to state depending on the size of the local government provisioning the plan. Generally, they will be tangible items that have a life expectancy greater than one year.

A local government will also need to forecast where it believes it will face future demands and growth, which will involve an inventory of existing facilities, infrastructure and equipment. In addition, a local government will want to develop basic policies for implementing the plan. Because the CIP includes financing issues, the municipality may want to seek advice from their financial advisor and/or bond counsel. A review of the municipality's current finances is also vital.

Once the CIP is finalized, the local government may be required to hold a public hearing before the plan is adopted by a city council, a board of regents and/or a bond review commission.

Specific steps
 Establish a capital planning committee with bylaws
 Take inventory of existing capital assets
 Evaluate previously approved, unimplemented or incomplete projects
 Assess financial capacity
 Solicit, compile and evaluate new project requests
 Prioritize projects
 Develop a financing plan
 Adopt a capital improvement program
 Monitor and manage approved projects within the CIP
 Update existing/ongoing capital programs

Developing a Capital Improvements Plan - Massachusetts 1997.pdf

References

External links
 Capital Project Management, British Columbia Ministry of Education
 City and County of San Francisco Ten Year Capital Plan
 City of Vancouver Capital Plan
 Government Finance Officers Association Committee on Economic Development and Capital Planning

Urban planning